Gizelle Annette Bryant (born September 9, 1970) is an American model, television personality, and author. She has appeared on the reality TV series The Real Housewives of Potomac since 2016, and was the First Lady of Empowerment Temple AME.

Early life and education 
Gizelle Bryant was born on September 9, 1970, in Houston, Texas, as Gizelle Graves to former politician and civil rights activist Curtis Graves and Joanne Graves. She graduated from Hampton University in 1992 with a degree in marketing. After college, she began a career as a model and appeared in numerous fashion campaigns and magazine spreads.

Career 
Since its premiere on January 17, 2016, Bryant has been the leading cast member of Bravo's The Real Housewives of Potomac.

In 2017, Bryant launched her beauty brand, EveryHue Beauty. Bryant's goal was to create the perfect product for women of all colors and complexions. She later became co-host of Bravo's Chat Room in 2020 alongside fellow Real Housewife Porsha Williams.

In November 2021, Bryant teamed up with Robyn Dixon for Reasonably Shady, a podcast featuring stories from their lives and how they deal with them. In 2022, the podcast was nominated for  Outstanding Arts and Entertainment Podcast at the 53rd NAACP Image Awards.

Published works 
Bryant turned her sights on writing a fiction book that chronicles her life as the First Lady of a megachurch. She published her book My Word in April 2019, for which she won an African-American Literary Award for Best Fiction.

Personal life 
Bryant moved to Baltimore after graduating from Hampton University. She married megachurch pastor and activist Jamal Harrison Bryant in 2002, and they have 3 daughters. They met when they were working together on civil rights and social justice at the National Association for the Advancement of Colored People's national headquarters in Baltimore, Maryland.

In 2008, Gizelle filed for divorce, accusing Jamal of adultery, they divorced later in 2009. 

On Bryant's maternal side, she is cousin to American journalist Suzanne Malveaux. Former Mayor of New Orleans Marc Morial is a distant cousin also. 

Bryant is a member of the Alpha Kappa Alpha sorority.

Filmography

References

External links 

1970 births
African-American models
African-American television personalities
People from Houston
People from Baltimore
People from Potomac, Maryland
Louisiana Creole people
Lists of reality show participants
The Real Housewives cast members
Hampton University alumni
Living people